Sigrid Holmquist (21 February 1899, in Borås – 9 July 1970, in Sydney, Australia), also known as Sie Holmquist or Bie Holmquist, was a Swedish actress during the silent film era. After three films in Sweden, she went to pursue a career in Hollywood. She appeared in 18 films between 1920 and 1927 before retiring from the screen.

Filmography

References

Forslund, Bengt (1995), Filmstjärnor: en bok om svenska skådespelerskor i världen, Stockholm: Alfabeta

External links

Swedish film actresses
Swedish silent film actresses
1899 births
1970 deaths
People from Borås
20th-century Swedish actresses
Swedish expatriates in the United States